Queensburgh Girls' High School is an all-girls high school located on Main Road, Queensburgh, KwaZulu-Natal, in South Africa. The school has a high level of academic success.

The school was established on 28 January 1969 when it split off from the co-educational Queensburgh High School..It is one of Durban's top 5 great high schools.

Notable alumnae 

 Mandisa Mfeka - the first South African female fighter pilot

References

External links
Official website

Girls' schools in South Africa
High schools in South Africa
Schools in KwaZulu-Natal
Educational institutions established in 1969
1969 establishments in South Africa
EThekwini Metropolitan Municipality